KVMX may refer to:

 KVMX (AM), a radio station (890 AM) licensed to serve Olivehurst, California, United States
 KVMX-FM, a radio station (92.1 FM) licensed to serve Placerville, California
 KQKZ, a radio station (92.1 FM) licensed to serve Bakersfield, California, which held the call sign KVMX from 2011 to 2016
 KPSL-FM, a radio station (96.5 FM) licensed to serve Bakersfield, California, which held the call sign KVMX from 2008 to 2011
 KXJM, a radio station (107.5 FM) licensed to serve Banks, Oregon, United States, which held the call sign KVMX from 2000 to 2008
 KABW, a radio station (95.1 FM) licensed to serve Baird, Texas, United States, which held the call sign KVMX from 1981 to 1999